The 2010 Supertaça de Angola (23rd edition) was contested by Petro de Luanda, the 2009 Girabola champion and Primeiro de Agosto, the 2009 Angola cup winner. On home court, D'Agosto beat Petro 2–1 to secure their 7th title as the away match ended in a draw.

Match details

First Leg

Second Leg

See also
 2009 Girabola
 2009 Angola Cup
 Primeiro de Agosto players
 Petro de Luanda players

External links
 Match photos

References

Supertaça de Angola
Super Cup